John Lloyd FRS (25 January 1750 – 24 April 1815) was a British naturalist.

He was the eldest son of Howel Lloyd of Hafodunos and Wigfair, was probably educated at Oxford University and then studied law at the Middle Temple, where he was called to the bar in 1781.

A man with a wide interest in the natural sciences including seismology and astronomy, he was elected a Fellow of the Royal Society in 1774.

He was the Member of Parliament (MP) for Flintshire from 1797 to 1799.

He died unmarried in 1815.

Selected works
  "An Account of the Late Discovery of Native Gold in Ireland,"  Letter from John Lloyd, Esq. F.R.S. to Sir Joseph Banks, Bart. KB PRS. Philosophical Transactions of the Royal Society of London, Vol. 86 (1796), pp. 34–37.

References

External links
 Royal Society—John Lloyd was elected to membership in the Society in 1774; and his nomination letter has been posted with other membership records at the Royal Society web site.    Those who nominated him for membership in the society were:  Daines Barrington; Daniel Solander; Charles Blagden; William Roy; John Walsh; Samuel Horsley; Joseph Banks; Edward King; Charles Francis Greville; Francis Wollaston; Constantine Phipps; Richard Penneck; Owen Salusbury Brereton

1750 births
1815 deaths
Members of the Middle Temple
Members of the Parliament of Great Britain for Welsh constituencies
British MPs 1796–1800
Fellows of the Royal Society